"HELIOS" S.A. is a multiplex cinema operator in Poland, established in 1992. It is one of Poland's major cinema operators. Since August 2010, Agora is the owner.

Current locations
Białystok (Galeria Biała) - 8 screens
Białystok (Alfa Centrum) - 7 screens
Bielsko-Biała - 7 screens
Dąbrowa Górnicza - 5 screens
Gdańsk - 8 screens
Gniezno - 3 screens
Gorzów Wielkopolski - 5 screens
Kalisz - 7 screens
Katowice - 9 screens
Kielce - 7 screens
Konin - 2 screens
Legnica - 5 screens
Lubin - 5 screens
Łódź - 2 screens
Nowy Sącz - 5 screens
Olsztyn - 8 screens
Opole - 6 screens
Piła - 4 screens
Piotrków Trybunalski - 5 screens
Płock - 5 screens
Poznań - 8 screens
Radom - 5 screens
Rzeszów - 4 screens
Sosnowiec - 4 screens
Szczecin - 4 screens
Warsaw (Blue City) - 8 screens
Wrocław - 9 screens
Wrocław (Magnolia Park) - 7 screens

References

External links
 Official Website

Cinema chains in Poland